Lee Lewis is an Australian theatre director.

Early life and education
Lewis trained as an actor at Columbia University in New York. Returning to Australia, she completed a Masters of Directing at the National Institute of Dramatic Art (NIDA) in 2005.

Career
In In 2006 she directed a play by New Zealand writer Matthew J. Saville about the Boer War entitled Kikia te Poa, which was performed at the Old Fitzroy Theatre in Sydney.

She was appointed artistic director of Sydney's Griffin Theatre Company in 2012. 

Lewis was appointed artistic director of the Queensland Theatre Company in 2019, succeeding Sam Strong who was her predecessor at Griffin as well.

Awards
2016: Helpmann Award for Best Direction of a Play for Griffin's production of The Bleeding Tree

References

External links 
 
 

Living people
Australian theatre directors
Helpmann Award winners
Year of birth missing (living people)
Place of birth missing (living people)
Women theatre directors